Donald McMillan or MacMillan may refer to:
 Donald McMillan (Ontario politician) (1835–1914), Senator from Ontario
 Donald McMillan (Quebec politician) (1807–1876), who represented Vaudreuil in the 1st Canadian Parliament
 Donald Baxter MacMillan (1874–1970), American explorer
 Donald MacMillan (rugby union) (born 1930), rugby union player who represented Australia
 Don MacMillan (1928-2004), Australian Olympic athlete